Mary Moreland is a 1917 American silent drama film starring stage actress Marjorie Rambeau that was released through Mutual Film. It is a lost film.

Plot
As described in a film magazine review, Thomas Maughm (Elliott), a Wall Street broker and unhappily married, finds himself in love with his secretary Mary Moreland (Rambeau). He confesses his love and she leaves his employ. After Mary has traveled around in various positions, she returns home. She learns of the death of Thomas' wife and this time she listens to his confessions of love.

Cast
Marjorie Rambeau - Mary Moreland
Robert Elliott - Thomas Maughm
Jean La Motte - Mrs. Daisy Maughm
Augusta Burmeister - Mrs. Moreland
Fraser Tarbutt - Basil Romney
Edna Holland - Cicely Torrance
Frank A. Ford -

Reception
Like many American films of the time, Mary Moreland was subject to cuts by city and state film censorship boards. The Chicago Board of Censors cut an intertitle that stated "Don't you know that your wife is going to have a child?"

References

External links

1917 films
American silent feature films
Films based on American novels
Lost American films
Silent American drama films
1917 drama films
Films directed by Frank Powell
American black-and-white films
Mutual Film films
1917 lost films
1910s American films